Pisaboa is a genus of South American cellar spiders that was first described by B. A. Huber in 2000.

Species
 it contains four species, found only in Bolivia, Venezuela, and Peru:
Pisaboa estrecha Huber, 2000 – Peru
Pisaboa laldea Huber, 2000 – Venezuela
Pisaboa mapiri Huber, 2000 – Bolivia
Pisaboa silvae Huber, 2000 (type) – Peru

See also
 List of Pholcidae species

References

Araneomorphae genera
Pholcidae
Spiders of South America